Mathew Frazer Horne (born 6 September 1978) is an English actor, comedian, singer, television presenter and narrator. He is best known for appearing on several BBC sketch shows and sitcoms, most notably Gavin & Stacey (as Gavin Shipman), The Catherine Tate Show, Horne & Corden, and Bad Education.

Early life
Horne was born on 6 September 1978 in Burton Joyce, Nottinghamshire. He attended Burton Joyce Primary School. While at school he played in goal for Notts County juniors. He studied A level performing arts at Southwell Minster School in Nottinghamshire, and gained a degree in drama from the University of Manchester. He met Bruce Mackinnon there in the first few weeks of term; they realised they shared a similar sense of humour, but did not write material together until the third year of their studies.

Career
Horne began his career as a comedian and became half of comedy duo Mat and MacKinnon, first performing at the Edinburgh Fringe in 2000. He was spotted at the festival by Catherine Tate, who invited him to perform in BBC TV programme The Catherine Tate Show.
Since then Horne has continued to appear in several Catherine Tate's Nan specials. He reprised his role as Jamie in two festive episodes of Catherine Tate's Nan in 2015.

In 2003, he starred in Channel 4's 20 Things to do Before You're 30 and in the following year he earned the role of Ben, an atheist RE teacher, in Channel 4 series Teachers. He also appeared in the first series of ITV production Doc Martin. In 2005, Horne appeared in an episode of The Smoking Room, playing Dominic, nephew of Janet. The latter was conducting a psychological study of the employees. In 2007 he starred in BBC sitcom Roman's Empire and in November appeared in comedy sketches in The Kylie Show on ITV1 alongside Kylie Minogue, playing her assistant. Horne was also a guest star in the second series of Robin Hood. From 2007 to 2010 he starred in double-BAFTA-winning series Gavin & Stacey as main character Gavin Shipman, a kind-hearted young man who gets together with a girl he has met through their work phone calls and falls in love with her. The programme ran for three series with a Christmas special and received widespread critical acclaim. He returned to this role for the Christmas special of 2019. In 2008, Horne appeared in a modern adaptation of the Three Billy Goats Gruff as part of the BBC's Fairy Tales season. He also narrated the ITV2 series The Passions of Girls Aloud.

Horne starred in the film Lesbian Vampire Killers  alongside James Corden and made his stage debut in a 2009 revival of Entertaining Mr Sloane at the Trafalgar Studios. On 3 April 2009, it was reported that Horne had collapsed on-stage during a West End performance of the play. He remained on stage until medical assistance arrived, at which point he was taken to hospital. A statement released soon after said he was exhausted after working "flat out" for three months. It was later revealed he was suffering from a virus.

On 18 February 2009, he presented the 2009 BRIT Awards alongside James Corden and Kylie Minogue.

In 2010, Horne appeared in an episode of Miss Marple, named "The Secret of Chimneys", as Bill Eversleigh. He appeared alongside fellow Gavin & Stacey star Ruth Jones.

He played Culture Club drummer Jon Moss in the 2010 BBC TV docudrama Worried About the Boy, about the teenage years of Boy George.

In 2016, Horne toured British theatres with Catherine Tate in The Catherine Tate Show Live. He also appeared as a young Mr. Grace in Are You Being Served?.

He played Private Walker in Dad's Army: The Missing Episodes, in the 2019 UKTV Original produced series. He starred in all three episodes aired on the TV channel Gold.

In early 2019, an announcement was made that Catherine Tate's Nan would be developed into a feature film adaptation. The film was scheduled to be released on 19 June 2020 but was indefinitely postponed due to cinemas being closed because of the COVID-19 pandemic. The trailer and poster for the film were released on 18 February 2022 with Josie Rourke receiving an executive producer credit and no director credited. The film was released on 18 March 2022.

Work with James Corden

Since working on the BBC sitcom Gavin & Stacey, Horne has collaborated a number of times with its co-creator James Corden.

Horne and Corden presented the Big Brother spin-off show Big Brother's Big Mouth as guests in 2007 and were then regulars for the run covering E4's Big Brother: Celebrity Hijack. They presented the NME Shockwaves Awards together in 2008 and a section of Comic Relief in March 2009. In 2008, the pair toured the UK with a stand-up show in preparation for their BBC sketch show Horne & Corden. The first episode was broadcast on 10 March 2009 on BBC Three. It was presented in front of a live audience, in a style reminiscent of Morecambe and Wise or The Two Ronnies. A variety of pre-filmed sketches and live performances were included.

2009 also saw the release of Lesbian Vampire Killers, a comedy horror film. Reviews of the film were largely negative. It holds a 29% approval rating on review aggregator Rotten Tomatoes with an average score of 4/10. James Christopher of The Times described it as "profoundly awful", stating that it is an "instantly forgettable lads' mag farce" and an "appalling waste of a perfectly decent title". Allan Hunter of the Daily Express called it "badly written and hastily executed" and "takes all the easy options of bad taste, bosoms and body fluids". Anthony Quinn, writing in The Independent, gave the film 1 star out of 5, describing it as woeful and stating Horne and Corden had "overstretched their appeal" and looked in danger of becoming today's Hale and Pace. Peter Bradshaw of The Guardian described the film as "mostly pretty awful, but there are one or two crass laughs".

Nicholas Yanes of Scifipulse.net found it to be "a great B film" worth becoming a cult classic. In September 2010, whilst on the comedy panel show, The King is Dead, Corden commented that watching the film would be too harsh a punishment for prisoners being held at Guantanamo Bay and that it was "a pile of shit".

Horne appeared alongside Corden in the CGI film Planet 51, with a minor part voicing a soldier, Vesklin.

Personal life
Horne splits his time between East London and Helmsdale in the Scottish Highlands. He is a fan of Tottenham Hotspur F.C. and has often been seen at Tottenham Hotspur Stadium. Horne is also the narrator of the stadium's multi media tour device. 

On 20 December 2018, Horne was struck by a train as he was crossing the railway line near to his parents' home in Burton Joyce, Nottinghamshire. Horne was said not to have been injured and had been near a dedicated pedestrian crossing across the Nottingham to Newark railway line.

Horne was engaged to actress Evelyn Hoskins until 2018. Horne married set-designer Celina Bassili in September 2021, in Norway. They had been romantically linked since July 2019.

Filmography

Film

Television

Stage

Radio

Awards and nominations

References

External links
 
 Voice-over artist
 2005 interview in the Guardian

1978 births
Living people
Alumni of the University of Manchester
English comedy writers
English male comedians
English male film actors
English male television actors
English stand-up comedians
English television presenters
Actors from Nottingham
People from Burton Joyce
21st-century English male actors
People from Helmsdale